Torda may refer to:

Localities in Romania
Torda, a Hungarian name for Turda, a city and municipality in Cluj County
Tordai-hasadék, a Hungarian name for Cheile Turzii, a natural reserve near Turda

Localities in Serbia
Torda (Žitište), a village near Žitište, Vojvodina, Serbia

History
Decree of Torda (14th century)
Edict of Torda (1568)
Maros-Torda County, former county of the Kingdom of Hungary
Torda-Aranyos County, former county of the Kingdom of Hungary
Torda County, former county of the Kingdom of Hungary, the Eastern Hungarian Kingdom and the Principality of Transylvania